Robert Pringle (1851 – 8 September 1902) was a Scottish professional golfer who played in the late 19th century. Pringle had four top-10 finishes in The Open Championship. His best performance was second place in the 1877 Open Championship.

Early life
Pringle was born in Dalkeith, Scotland, in 1851.  He was the son of David Pringle and his wife Mary Hilston.  He learned golf by starting out as a caddie. Pringle was described as having an admirable swing, one that was technically correct and aesthetically pleasing to see. He was said to be a great stylist of the day, in the manner of Harry Vardon.

In October 1874, Pringle stunned a strong field in a four-round tournament on the Musselburgh Links.  His success in winning the tournament was described in a magazine article at the time as "the whole of the 'cracks' had been vanquished by a hitherto unknown caddie, named Pringle."

Golf career

1877 Open Championship
Pringle's best result as a player came in the 1877 Open Championship held 6 April at Musselburgh Links, Musselburgh, East Lothian, Scotland. Pringle played solid golf but Jamie Anderson won the Championship by two strokes.  Pringle finished in second place, carding rounds of 44-38-40-40=162, and won £6.

Details of play
Davie Strath and Bob Ferguson played together but Strath had a disappointing 45 in the first round which left him well behind the leaders. Ferguson, too, began in disappointing fashion but managed to salvage a 40. William Brown led on 39 with Ferguson and Jamie Anderson on 40. After two rounds, three players were level on 80: Brown, Ferguson and William Cosgrove with Anderson and Pringle only two behind. Strath was five behind on 85.

Anderson carded a 37 in the third round while Ferguson could muster only a 40 and Davie Strath scored 38. Anderson now led on 119 with Ferguson on 120 and Strath on 123. In the final round Strath took a horrendous 9 at the second hole to drop out of contention. Ferguson also had a disappointing last round and Anderson's 41 was enough to give him the Championship.

Death
Pringle died on 8 September 1902. A "nervous affliction" affected one of his hands, ending his playing career. He died in poverty at the Inveresk poorhouse.

Tournament wins (1)
Note: This list may be incomplete.
1874 Musselburgh Tournament

Results in The Open Championship

Note: Pringle played only in The Open Championship.

DNP = Did not play
"T" indicates a tie for a place
RET = Retired
Yellow background for top-10

References

Scottish male golfers
1851 births
1902 deaths